The Braille pattern dots-13 is a 6-dot braille cell with the top and bottom left dots raised, or an 8-dot braille cell with the top and middle-bottom left dots raised. It is represented by the Unicode code point U+2805, and in Braille ASCII with "K".

Unified Braille

In unified international braille, the braille pattern dots-13 is used to represent an unvoiced velar plosive, ie /k/.

Table of unified braille values

Other braille

Plus dots 7 and 8

Related to Braille pattern dots-13 are Braille patterns 137, 138, and 1378, which are used in 8-dot braille systems, such as Gardner-Salinas and Luxembourgish Braille.

Related 8-dot kantenji patterns

In the Japanese kantenji braille, the standard 8-dot Braille patterns 27, 127, 247, and 1247 are the patterns related to Braille pattern dots-13, since the two additional dots of kantenji patterns 013, 137, and 0137 are placed above the base 6-dot cell, instead of below, as in standard 8-dot braille.

Kantenji using braille patterns 27, 127, 247, or 1247

This listing includes kantenji using Braille pattern dots-13 for all 6349 kanji found in JIS C 6226-1978.

  - 人

Variants and thematic compounds

  -  selector 1 + な/亻  =  意
  -  selector 4 + な/亻  =  台
  -  selector 4 + selector 4 + な/亻  =  臺
  -  selector 5 + な/亻  =  夾
  -  selector 6 + な/亻  =  竟
  -  な/亻 + selector 6  =  体

Compounds of 人

  -  い/糹/#2 + な/亻  =  伊
  -  た/⽥ + な/亻  =  佃
  -  し/巿 + な/亻  =  侍
  -  ね/示 + な/亻  =  依
  -  な/亻 + な/亻  =  僕
  -  に/氵 + な/亻 + な/亻  =  濮
  -  そ/馬 + な/亻  =  儀
  -  比 + な/亻  =  入
  -  ひ/辶 + な/亻  =  込
  -  れ/口 + 比 + な/亻  =  叺
  -  つ/土 + 比 + な/亻  =  圦
  -  き/木 + 比 + な/亻  =  杁
  -  な/亻 + 龸 + せ/食  =  鳰
  -  れ/口 + な/亻  =  史
  -  そ/馬 + れ/口 + な/亻  =  駛
  -  囗 + な/亻  =  囚
  -  に/氵 + 囗 + な/亻  =  泅
  -  龸 + な/亻  =  夜
  -  に/氵 + な/亻  =  液
  -  て/扌 + 龸 + な/亻  =  掖
  -  ⺼ + 龸 + な/亻  =  腋
  -  ゆ/彳 + な/亻  =  夷
  -  ふ/女 + ゆ/彳 + な/亻  =  姨
  -  に/氵 + ゆ/彳 + な/亻  =  洟
  -  や/疒 + ゆ/彳 + な/亻  =  痍
  -  か/金 + ゆ/彳 + な/亻  =  銕
  -  す/発 + な/亻  =  臥
  -  な/亻 + 仁/亻  =  伺
  -  く/艹 + な/亻  =  荷
  -  宿 + な/亻  =  褒
  -  龸 + な/亻 + れ/口  =  襃
  -  も/門 + な/亻  =  閃
  -  な/亻 + つ/土  =  仕
  -  な/亻 + つ/土 + れ/口  =  佶
  -  な/亻 + つ/土 + 囗  =  僖
  -  な/亻 + ち/竹  =  他
  -  な/亻 + し/巿  =  付
  -  ち/竹 + な/亻  =  符
  -  な/亻 + よ/广  =  俯
  -  れ/口 + な/亻 + し/巿  =  咐
  -  つ/土 + な/亻 + し/巿  =  坿
  -  て/扌 + な/亻 + し/巿  =  拊
  -  き/木 + な/亻 + し/巿  =  柎
  -  く/艹 + な/亻 + し/巿  =  苻
  -  せ/食 + な/亻 + し/巿  =  鮒
  -  な/亻 + ん/止  =  仮
  -  な/亻 + さ/阝  =  仰
  -  な/亻 + 宿  =  仲
  -  な/亻 + そ/馬  =  件
  -  な/亻 + そ/馬 + selector 2  =  佯
  -  な/亻 + け/犬  =  伏
  -  心 + な/亻 + け/犬  =  茯
  -  ね/示 + な/亻 + け/犬  =  袱
  -  な/亻 + き/木  =  休
  -  る/忄 + な/亻 + き/木  =  恷
  -  火 + な/亻 + き/木  =  烋
  -  そ/馬 + な/亻 + き/木  =  貅
  -  せ/食 + な/亻 + き/木  =  鮴
  -  な/亻 + て/扌  =  伝
  -  な/亻 + も/門  =  似
  -  な/亻 + 日  =  但
  -  な/亻 + ま/石  =  位
  -  く/艹 + な/亻 + ま/石  =  莅
  -  な/亻 + ま/石 + り/分  =  僮
  -  な/亻 + へ/⺩  =  住
  -  な/亻 + か/金  =  何
  -  な/亻 + と/戸  =  併
  -  な/亻 + ぬ/力  =  例
  -  な/亻 + こ/子  =  供
  -  な/亻 + に/氵  =  価
  -  な/亻 + な/亻 + に/氵  =  價
  -  な/亻 + は/辶  =  侮
  -  な/亻 + ゐ/幺  =  係
  -  な/亻 + み/耳  =  促
  -  な/亻 + む/車  =  俊
  -  な/亻 + た/⽥  =  俗
  -  な/亻 + れ/口  =  保
  -  つ/土 + な/亻 + れ/口  =  堡
  -  く/艹 + な/亻 + れ/口  =  葆
  -  ね/示 + な/亻 + れ/口  =  褓
  -  な/亻 + え/訁  =  信
  -  な/亻 + う/宀/#3  =  修
  -  く/艹 + な/亻 + う/宀/#3  =  蓚
  -  な/亻 + 火  =  俳
  -  な/亻 + 囗  =  個
  -  な/亻 + ゆ/彳  =  倒
  -  な/亻 + や/疒  =  候
  -  な/亻 + ね/示  =  借
  -  な/亻 + め/目  =  値
  -  な/亻 + る/忄  =  倫
  -  な/亻 + い/糹/#2  =  偉
  -  な/亻 + ふ/女  =  健
  -  な/亻 + く/艹  =  偶
  -  な/亻 + ほ/方  =  傍
  -  な/亻 + ひ/辶  =  備
  -  る/忄 + な/亻 + ひ/辶  =  憊
  -  な/亻 + を/貝  =  債
  -  な/亻 + お/頁  =  傾
  -  な/亻 + り/分  =  働
  -  な/亻 + な/亻  =  僕
  -  な/亻 + ろ/十  =  僚
  -  な/亻 + の/禾  =  儒
  -  な/亻 + な/亻 + ん/止  =  假
  -  な/亻 + な/亻 + て/扌  =  傳
  -  な/亻 + 宿 + ろ/十  =  什
  -  な/亻 + 宿 + ぬ/力  =  仂
  -  な/亻 + 宿 + と/戸  =  仆
  -  な/亻 + selector 1 + ゐ/幺  =  仍
  -  な/亻 + 宿 + 仁/亻  =  从
  -  な/亻 + 比 + 火  =  仗
  -  な/亻 + selector 1 + ぬ/力  =  仞
  -  な/亻 + 数 + せ/食  =  仟
  -  な/亻 + 仁/亻 + 宿  =  价
  -  な/亻 + 宿 + 宿  =  伉
  -  な/亻 + 数 + ら/月  =  伍
  -  な/亻 + 宿 + は/辶  =  伎
  -  な/亻 + れ/口 + ろ/十  =  估
  -  な/亻 + 仁/亻 + ろ/十  =  伶
  -  な/亻 + 比 + 数  =  佑
  -  な/亻 + selector 6 + け/犬  =  佚
  -  な/亻 + も/門 + selector 5  =  佝
  -  な/亻 + む/車 + し/巿  =  佩
  -  な/亻 + 数 + め/目  =  佰
  -  な/亻 + 数 + 宿  =  佻
  -  な/亻 + 龸 + ち/竹  =  佼
  -  な/亻 + れ/口 + う/宀/#3  =  侃
  -  な/亻 + ほ/方 + ほ/方  =  侈
  -  な/亻 + selector 5 + か/金  =  侏
  -  な/亻 + ろ/十 + ら/月  =  侑
  -  な/亻 + 宿 + な/亻  =  侠
  -  な/亻 + 宿 + な/亻  =  侠
  -  な/亻 + ふ/女 + 火  =  侭
  -  な/亻 + 囗 + selector 1  =  俄
  -  な/亻 + selector 5 + そ/馬  =  俎
  -  な/亻 + の/禾 + ぬ/力  =  俐
  -  な/亻 + め/目 + 宿  =  俔
  -  な/亻 + 宿 + う/宀/#3  =  俘
  -  な/亻 + 比 + り/分  =  俚
  -  な/亻 + ぬ/力 + 宿  =  俛
  -  な/亻 + selector 6 + む/車  =  俟
  -  な/亻 + selector 1 + け/犬  =  俣
  -  な/亻 + ゆ/彳 + 宿  =  俤
  -  な/亻 + 宿 + む/車  =  俥
  -  な/亻 + う/宀/#3 + ゑ/訁  =  俶
  -  な/亻 + け/犬 + ほ/方  =  俸
  -  な/亻 + た/⽥ + さ/阝  =  俾
  -  な/亻 + ち/竹 + selector 4  =  倆
  -  な/亻 + 龸 + け/犬  =  倏
  -  な/亻 + 宿 + も/門  =  們
  -  な/亻 + と/戸 + へ/⺩  =  倔
  -  な/亻 + つ/土 + か/金  =  倖
  -  な/亻 + け/犬 + か/金  =  倚
  -  な/亻 + り/分 + 日  =  倡
  -  な/亻 + う/宀/#3 + き/木  =  倥
  -  な/亻 + け/犬 + さ/阝  =  倦
  -  な/亻 + と/戸 + selector 1  =  倨
  -  な/亻 + し/巿 + せ/食  =  倩
  -  な/亻 + こ/子 + 宿  =  倪
  -  な/亻 + 日 + と/戸  =  倬
  -  な/亻 + の/禾 + ふ/女  =  倭
  -  な/亻 + を/貝 + selector 5  =  倶
  -  な/亻 + 龸 + も/門  =  偃
  -  な/亻 + 宿 + 氷/氵  =  偈
  -  な/亻 + よ/广 + う/宀/#3  =  偐
  -  な/亻 + 比 + 日  =  偕
  -  な/亻 + と/戸 + 日  =  偖
  -  な/亻 + れ/口 + 氷/氵  =  做
  -  な/亻 + 宿 + こ/子  =  偬
  -  な/亻 + 宿 + ゆ/彳  =  偸
  -  な/亻 + お/頁 + に/氵  =  傀
  -  な/亻 + 宿 + て/扌  =  傅
  -  な/亻 + よ/广 + 囗  =  傭
  -  な/亻 + 宿 + ほ/方  =  傲
  -  な/亻 + 宿 + る/忄  =  僂
  -  な/亻 + 日 + け/犬  =  僣
  -  な/亻 + 宿 + つ/土  =  僥
  -  な/亻 + 宿 + た/⽥  =  僵
  -  な/亻 + 宿 + ま/石  =  僻
  -  な/亻 + 宿 + い/糹/#2  =  儁
  -  な/亻 + た/⽥ + ろ/十  =  儂
  -  な/亻 + へ/⺩ + し/巿  =  儔
  -  な/亻 + さ/阝 + 龸  =  儕
  -  な/亻 + す/発 + ⺼  =  儖
  -  な/亻 + 龸 + ほ/方  =  儚
  -  な/亻 + た/⽥ + た/⽥  =  儡
  -  な/亻 + 囗 + 比  =  儷
  -  な/亻 + く/艹 + い/糹/#2  =  儺
  -  な/亻 + 龸 + 宿  =  儻
  -  な/亻 + よ/广 + 氷/氵  =  儼

Compounds of 意

  -  数 + な/亻  =  億
  -  れ/口 + selector 1 + な/亻  =  噫
  -  心 + selector 1 + な/亻  =  檍

Compounds of 台 and 臺

  -  ふ/女 + な/亻  =  始
  -  ほ/方 + な/亻  =  殆
  -  氷/氵 + な/亻  =  治
  -  ⺼ + な/亻  =  胎
  -  心 + な/亻  =  苔
  -  む/車 + な/亻  =  颱
  -  せ/食 + な/亻  =  飴
  -  な/亻 + 心  =  怠
  -  る/忄 + selector 4 + な/亻  =  怡
  -  ち/竹 + selector 4 + な/亻  =  笞
  -  い/糹/#2 + selector 4 + な/亻  =  紿
  -  え/訁 + selector 4 + な/亻  =  詒
  -  を/貝 + selector 4 + な/亻  =  貽
  -  そ/馬 + selector 4 + な/亻  =  駘
  -  て/扌 + う/宀/#3 + な/亻  =  抬
  -  く/艹 + selector 4 + な/亻  =  薹
  -  て/扌 + selector 4 + な/亻  =  擡

Compounds of 夾

  -  け/犬 + な/亻  =  狭
  -  け/犬 + け/犬 + な/亻  =  狹
  -  や/疒 + な/亻  =  峡
  -  や/疒 + や/疒 + な/亻  =  峽
  -  お/頁 + な/亻  =  頬
  -  て/扌 + selector 5 + な/亻  =  挾
  -  ち/竹 + selector 5 + な/亻  =  筴
  -  に/氵 + 宿 + な/亻  =  浹
  -  な/亻 + 宿 + め/目  =  爽
  -  ち/竹 + 宿 + な/亻  =  篋
  -  く/艹 + 宿 + な/亻  =  莢
  -  て/扌 + 宿 + な/亻  =  挟
  -  さ/阝 + 宿 + な/亻  =  陜
  -  さ/阝 + 龸 + な/亻  =  陝
  -  か/金 + 宿 + な/亻  =  鋏

Compounds of 竟

  -  つ/土 + な/亻  =  境
  -  る/忄 + な/亻  =  憶
  -  ら/月 + な/亻  =  臆
  -  か/金 + な/亻  =  鏡

Other compounds

  -  う/宀/#3 + な/亻  =  宅
  -  龸 + う/宀/#3 + な/亻  =  亳
  -  な/亻 + う/宀/#3 + な/亻  =  侘
  -  れ/口 + う/宀/#3 + な/亻  =  咤
  -  え/訁 + な/亻  =  託
  -  ゑ/訁 + な/亻  =  詫
  -  き/木 + な/亻  =  来
  -  き/木 + き/木 + な/亻  =  來
  -  ゆ/彳 + き/木 + な/亻  =  徠
  -  る/忄 + き/木 + な/亻  =  憖
  -  心 + き/木 + な/亻  =  莱
  -  を/貝 + き/木 + な/亻  =  賚
  -  り/分 + な/亻  =  傘
  -  な/亻 + お/頁 + ろ/十  =  倅
  -  よ/广 + な/亻  =  座
  -  く/艹 + よ/广 + な/亻  =  蓙
  -  な/亻 + 囗 + れ/口  =  嗇
  -  日 + な/亻  =  更
  -  ま/石 + な/亻  =  硬
  -  仁/亻 + な/亻  =  便
  -  と/戸 + 仁/亻 + な/亻  =  鞭
  -  れ/口 + 日 + な/亻  =  哽
  -  や/疒 + 日 + な/亻  =  峺
  -  心 + 日 + な/亻  =  梗
  -  の/禾 + 日 + な/亻  =  粳
  -  な/亻 + せ/食 + い/糹/#2  =  甦
  -  て/扌 + な/亻  =  撲
  -  き/木 + 宿 + な/亻  =  樸
  -  へ/⺩ + 宿 + な/亻  =  璞
  -  み/耳 + 宿 + な/亻  =  蹼
  -  な/亻 + な/亻 + selector 6  =  體
  -  心 + 宿 + な/亻  =  梛
  -  の/禾 + 比 + な/亻  =  糴
  -  え/訁 + き/木 + な/亻  =  誄
  -  な/亻 + 宿 + さ/阝  =  那
  -  な/亻 + 宿 + せ/食  =  雁

Notes

Braille patterns